Hesar-e Olya (also Romanized as Ḩeşār-e ‘Olyā and Hesar Olya; also known as Ḩeşār-e Bālā and Hisār Bāla) is a village in Shivanat Rural District, Afshar District, Khodabandeh County, Zanjan Province, Iran. At the 2006 census, its population was 350, in 67 families.

References 

Populated places in Khodabandeh County